GusGus is an electronic music band from Reykjavík, Iceland.  Although initially a film and acting collective, the group is mostly known for its electronic music. The group's discography consists of eleven studio albums.

History 
GusGus was initially formed in 1995 as a film and acting collective. The band's name refers to the 1974 German film Ali: Fear Eats the Soul by Rainer Werner Fassbinder, where a female character is cooking couscous for her lover, pronouncing it Gusgus. GusGus' music is eclectic, and although primarily classified as techno, trip hop, and house music, the band has experimented with other styles. They have remixed songs of popular artists such as Björk, Depeche Mode, Moloko, and Sigur Rós.

Membership in the band has varied, and included:
 Daníel Ágúst Haraldsson
 Emilíana Torrini Davíðsdóttir
 Magnús Jónsson (aka Blake)
 Hafdís Huld Þrastardóttir
 Urður Hákonardóttir (aka Earth)
 Högni Egilsson
 Birgir Þórarinsson (aka Biggi Veira or Biggo)
 Magnús Guðmundsson (aka Maggi Lego, Herb Legowitz, Hunk of a Man, Buckmaster De La Cruz, The Fox, Fuckmaster, or Herr Legowitz)
 Stephan Stephensen (aka President Bongo, Alfred More, or President Penis)
 Sigurður Kjartansson (aka Siggi Kinski)
 Stefán Árni Þorgeirsson
 Baldur Stefánsson (Director of Financial Arts, aka DJ Tekno Jörgensen)
 Ragnheiður Axel
 Páll Garðarsson

In 1997, the band performed in Toronto. They returned for a second visit as part of a tour supporting their second album, This is Normal.

In 1998, a remix of the track "Purple" appeared on Paul Oakenfold's trance compilation Tranceport.

After the group's third album, This Is Normal (1999), the filmmaking arm of GusGus (Kjartansson and Árni Þorgeirsson) split off to form the production company Celebrator, now known as Arni & Kinski, which has produced advertisements and videos.

In January 2004, they released the song "Desire" with Ian Brown. 

As of 2011 the band had sold over 700,000 copies worldwide.

Its 2015 incarnation consists of four members (President Bongo, Biggi Veira, Urður Hákonardóttir and Daníel Ágúst Haraldsson). A few former members such as Hafdís Huld, Blake, and Daníel Ágúst have gone solo; Emilíana Torrini provided a song for the soundtrack of Peter Jackson's film The Lord of the Rings: The Two Towers.

Band members

Timeline

Discography

Studio albums 
 Gus Gus (1995)
 Polydistortion (1997) — UK No. 130
 This Is Normal (1999) — UK No. 94
 Gus Gus vs. T-World (2000)
 Attention (2002)
 Forever (2007)
 24/7 (2009)
 Arabian Horse (2011)
 Mexico (2014)
 Lies Are More Flexible (2018)
 Mobile Home (2021)

Live albums 
 Mixed Live at Sirkus, Reykjavik (2003)

Compilations 
 15 ára (2010)

Singles 
 "Polyesterday" (1996) — UK No. 55 (as Purple EP: Polyesterday)
 "Believe" (1997) — UK No. 154
 "Standard Stuff for Drama" (1997)
 "Ladyshave" (1999) — UK No. 64
 "V.I.P." (1999) — UK No. 86
 "Starlovers" (1999) — UK No. 62
 "Dance You Down" (2002) — UK No. 141
 "Desire" (2002) — UK No. 95
 "David" (2003) — UK No. 52
 "Call of the Wild" (2003) — UK No. 75
 "Lust / Porn" (2005)
 "Need in Me" (2005) — BG No. 24
 "Forever Sampler" (2006)
 "Moss" (2007)
 "Hold You" (2007)
 "Add This Song" (2009)
 "Thin Ice" (2009)
 "Within You" (2011)
 "Over" (2011)
 "Deep Inside" (2011)
 "Crossfade" (2014)
 "Obnoxiously Sexual" (2014)
 "Mexico" (2014)
 "Airwaves" (2014)
 "Featherlight" (2017)
 "Don't Know How to Love" (2018)
 "Lifetime" (2019)
 "Out of Place" (2020)
 "Higher" feat Vök (2020)
 "Stay the Ride" (2021)
 "Our World" (2021)
 "Love is Alone" feat John Grant (2021)

See also
List of bands from Iceland

References

External links
 

Trance music groups
Icelandic electronic music groups
4AD artists
Musical groups from Reykjavík